PCBC may refer to:

 Pembroke College Boat Club (Cambridge)
 Pembroke College Boat Club (Oxford)
 Philippine Chinese Baptist Convention
 Propagating cipher-block chaining, mode of encryption for block ciphers; see Block cipher mode of operation#Propagating Cipher Block Chaining (PCBC)
 Provincial Court of British Columbia